Sir Edwyn Clement Hoskyns, 13th Baronet,  (9 August 1884 – 28 June 1937) was an English Anglican priest and theologian.

Career
Hoskyns was born on 9 August 1884 in Notting Hill, London, the eldest child and only son of Bishop Edwyn Hoskyns and his wife Mary Constance Maude Benson. He was educated at Haileybury College, Jesus College, Cambridge and Wells Theological College, graduating from the latter in 1907. Hoskyns was a fellow and Dean of Corpus Christi College, Cambridge, and a notable biblical scholar. On his father's death in 1925, he succeeded to the Hoskyns baronetcy. His influence on the next generation of clergymen was considerable, e.g., on Michael Ramsey, Gabriel Hebert, Christopher Evans, Donald Lynch, and C. K. Barrett.

Hoskyns served in the Great War as a Temporary Chaplain to the Forces. He was commissioned in July 1915, and served in Egypt and France. He was described as 'A capable chaplain. Hard worker. Has made a good SCF (Senior Chaplain to the Forces).’ He was awarded the Military Cross, 'For conspicuous gallantry and devotion to duty. Under heavy shell fire he personally placed wounded in a safe place, and was solely responsible from preventing them falling into the hands of the enemy. He remained with them until all had been evacuated, being slightly wounded himself. Next day he showed conspicuous courage in tending wounded in an exposed position under heavy shell and machine-gun fire for nine hours without a break.'

He died on 28 June 1937 in London and was buried in Grantchester, Cambridgeshire.

Writings
 The Riddle of the New Testament. With Francis Noel Davey. London: Faber & Faber, 1931
 The Epistle to the Romans, by Karl Barth; translated from the 6th edition by Edwyn C. Hoskyns. Oxford University Press, 1933
 Cambridge Sermons. London: SPCK, 1938
 The Fourth Gospel. London: Faber & Faber, 1940
 Crucifixion-Resurrection: The Pattern of the Theology and Ethics of the New Testament. Edwyn Clement Hoskyns & Francis Noel Davey. London: SPCK, 1981.

Arms

References

Footnotes

Bibliography

 
 
 
 
 

1884 births
1937 deaths
20th-century Anglican theologians
20th-century English male writers
20th-century Church of England clergy
20th-century English Anglican priests
20th-century English theologians
Alumni of Jesus College, Cambridge
Anglo-Catholic biblical scholars
Anglo-Catholic clergy
Anglo-Catholic theologians
Baronets in the Baronetage of England
British biblical scholars
Clergy from London
English Anglo-Catholics
English male non-fiction writers
Fellows of Corpus Christi College, Cambridge
New Testament scholars
People from Notting Hill
Recipients of the Military Cross